Ellakudy  is a village in Tiruchirappalli taluk of Tiruchirappalli district, Tamil Nadu, India. It was merged with the Tiruchirappalli Corporation in 2011.

Demographics 

As per the 2001 census, Ellakudy had a population of 4125 with 2093 males and 2032 females. The sex ratio was 971 and the literacy rate, 94.34.

References 

Villages in Tiruchirappalli district